Lưu Quang Vũ (17 April 1948 – 29 August 1988) was a Vietnamese playwright and poet. His wife Xuân Quỳnh was a Vietnamese poet. Both parents and their 12-year-old son Lưu Quỳnh Thơ were killed in a traffic collision in 1988. In 2000 he was posthumously awarded the Ho Chi Minh Prize for his play The Ninth Pledge (Lời thề thứ 9).

He is the father of Lưu Minh Vũ, who is known as one of the hosts in the Vietnamese version of The Price Is Right.

Works

Poetry
Hương cây - Smell of the tree  (1968)
Mây trắng của đời tôi - White clouds of my life (1989).
Bầy ong trong đêm sâu - Bees in a late night (1993)
 other works in collections

Theatre
Sống mãi tuổi 17 - Forever 17
Nàng Sita - The Sita lady
Hẹn ngày trở lại - We'll see each other again
Nếu anh không đốt lửa - If you didnt light a fire
Hồn Trương Ba da hàng thịt - Truong Ba's soul in the Butcher's skin
Lời thề thứ 9 - The ninth oath
Khoảnh khắc và vô tận - An instant and the eternity
Bệnh sĩ - Egotism
Tôi và chúng ta - I and We
Người tốt nhà số 5 - The good man at the 5th
Chiếc ô công lý - The justice umbrella
Ông không phải là bố tôi - You're not my father
Lời nói dối cuối cùng - The last lie

References

Vietnamese dramatists and playwrights
Vietnamese male poets
1948 births
1988 deaths
Road incident deaths in Vietnam
20th-century Vietnamese poets
20th-century dramatists and playwrights
20th-century male writers